ZSG may refer to:

 Goodyear ZSG A US Navy anti-submarine patrol blimp
 The Zombie Survival Guide, a tongue-in-cheek survival manual dealing with the potentiality of a zombie attack
 Zürichsee-Schifffahrtsgesellschaft, a public Swiss company operating boats on Lake Zürich